(The Rats) is a 1955 West German drama film directed by Robert Siodmak. It is an adaptation of the 1911 play The Rats by Gerhart Hauptmann, but transferred the story to the early 1950s, shortly after the Second World War.

It tells the story of the destitute Polish woman Pauline, who sells her illegitimate baby for a few hundred Deutsche Mark to the childless Anna John. The film won the Golden Bear award.

It was shot at the Spandau Studios in Berlin. The film's sets were designed by the art directors Hans Jürgen Kiebach and Rolf Zehetbauer.

Cast

References

External links
 
 

1955 films
1955 drama films
German drama films
West German films
1950s German-language films
Films set in Berlin
Films based on works by Gerhart Hauptmann
German films based on plays
Films directed by Robert Siodmak
Golden Bear winners
Films shot at Spandau Studios
German black-and-white films
1950s German films